The National Basketball League (NBL) is the pre-eminent men's professional basketball league in Australia and New Zealand. The league was founded in 1979.

List

See also

List of WNBL seasons
List of NBL1 seasons

References

External links

 
seasons